Agneta Liselotte "Lisa" Andersson (born 31 August 1961, in Malmö) is a Swedish archer.

Archery

Andersson won a bronze medal at the 1983 World Archery Championships.

She competed at the 1984 Summer Olympic Games in the women's individual event and finished fourteenth with 2468 points scored.

At the 1988 Summer Olympic Games she came thirteenth in the women's individual event and seventh in the women's team event.

References

External links 
 Profile on worldarchery.org
 Profile on sok.se

1961 births
Living people
Swedish female archers
Olympic archers of Sweden
Archers at the 1984 Summer Olympics
Archers at the 1988 Summer Olympics
World Archery Championships medalists
Sportspeople from Malmö
20th-century Swedish women